Channel 21, formerly known as RTL Shop, is a German cable and satellite shopping network based in Hanover. The network was part of Europe's largest media company RTL Group and supplies programming to more than 20 German-language stations. RTL Group is a unit of the German media company Bertelsmann. Channel 21 was launched as RTL Shop on 1 March 2001. The main competitors are HSE24 (Home Shopping Europe) and QVC.

History
Up until September 2006, RTL Shop was produced at the Coloneum in Cologne. In the summer of 2006, a new broadcasting center with administration and studios was set up in Hanover, which was ready for broadcast on October 1, 2006. A new edition of the product range should lead to the acquisition of female customers as well as the male target group. Cologne Broadcasting Center (CBC), a RTL Group subsidiary, was responsible for setting up and operating the broadcasting center.

RTL Shop was part of the diversification strategy of the RTL Group, which had the goal of opening up additional sources of income in addition to the traditional advertising customers.

On 19 February 2008 it was announced that RTL would sell RTL Shop in the first half of 2008. Since broadcasting in 2001, the station had only made losses every year despite relocating from Cologne to Hanover and restructuring. In the course of this, Walter Freiwald left the teleshopping channel in April 2008. The new owner was the investor group Aurelius AG from Munich. The goal was to be achieved profitability in the coming years.

On January 1, 2009, RTL Shop gradually switched to Channel 21, and became its official name on March 1, 2009. At the same time the names of special offers were changed to recommendation of the day (Empfehlung des Tages), bonus recommendation (Bonusempfehlung), this hour only (Nur in dieser Stunde) and highlight of the week (Highlight der Woche).

The logo has also been changed in stages. First, the RTL was replaced by Channel 21, later dyed in orange and gray, then proportionally larger than the shop centered under Channel 21, meanwhile without box, in the middle.

Since the second half of 2009 until September 30, 2012, there has also been the branch Channel 21 Express.

As of January 1, 2010, Michael Oplesch, the former managing director of the TV channel VIVA Germany, bought the first shares of Channel 21 from Aurelius AG with his Centuere AG. On February 16, 2010, the full sale of all shares in Channel 21 to Centuere AG was announced. The sale took place in full legal force on 1 March 2010. Michael Oplesch took over the management of the company. As announced on May 30, 2010, the EM.TV founder and former managing director of EM.TV Thomas Haffa already took over all shares of Centuere AG at the end of April and transferred them to the newly founded Channel 21 Holding, which has operated the channels Channel 21 and Channel 21 Express since then. On December 10, 2010, it became public that Channel 21 is threatened with bankruptcy. A large proportion of the employees were therefore dismissed in December.

Channel 21, according to the media portal DWDL.de from May 2012, planned a restructuring to make the company economically viable. Accordingly, it was decided in a general meeting that almost the entire workforce would be terminated as of August 31, 2012. As of September 2012, the station should have only 15 employees. The restructuring took place as a result of the critical financial year in which Channel 21 lost many of its suppliers, including the manufacturer of cookware Wollpfannen, which was one of the few major suppliers of the shopping channel and now supplies the competitor QVC.
From now on, Channel 21 is still using teleshopping proprietary brands of the "Maxx" line and does not use genuine branded products.

Channel 21 has been broadcasting in the 16:9 format since 31 October 2012. The design and studio have been refreshed as a result.

Broadcasting in HDTV started via Astra 1L on 30 January 2016. The resolution is 1440x1080.

Presenters

Ralf Kühler (2001–present)
Walter Freiwald (2001–2008)
Maren Gilzer (2001–2008)
Alida-Nadine Kurras (2011–present)
Max Schradin (2012–2014)
Natascha Zuraw (2001–2005)
Jenny Elvers (–2009)
Anja Kruse (–2008)
Alexandra Philipps
Andrea Rubio Sanchez
Anna Heesch
Christian Schmidt
Edwina Eidtmann
Olaf Stannek
Stephanie Frohmann (2015–)
Claudia Peltzer
Daniela Wieneke
Dirk Zacharias
Herbert Plum
Gerald Wespiser
Ricarda M
Heike Schuberth
Helga Nosek
Jutta Leibfried
Karima Becker
Martin Vietmeyer
Nicole Frenz
Peter Fischer
Winfried Miller
Sasha Hughes
Dominik Blagovic
Serena Salecker
Luisa Verfürth
Caroline Babiel-Dicke
Désirée Nick
Mirja Du Mont
Ute Schliessmann
Natascha Ochsenknecht
Isolde Semm
Allegra Curtis

References

External links
 

Television stations in Germany
Shopping networks
Television channels and stations established in 2001
2001 establishments in Germany
Mass media in Hanover